The Kuba Kingdom, also known as the Kingdom of the Bakuba or Bushongo, is a traditional kingdom in Central Africa. The Kuba Kingdom flourished between the 17th and 19th centuries in the region bordered by the Sankuru, Lulua, and Kasai rivers in the heart of the modern-day Democratic Republic of the Congo.

The Kuba Kingdom was a conglomerate of several smaller Bushongo-speaking principalities as well as the Kete, Coofa, Mbeengi, and the Kasai Twa Pygmies. The original Kuba migrated during the 16th century from the north. Nineteen different ethnic groups are included in the kingdom, which still exists and is presided over by the King (nyim).

History

Shyaam a-Mbul
The kingdom began as a conglomeration of several chiefdoms of various ethnic groups with no real central authority. In approximately 1625, an individual from outside the area known as Shyaam a-Mbul a Ngoong usurped the position of one of the area rulers and united all the chiefdoms under his leadership. Tradition states that Shyaam a-Mbul was the adopted son of a Kuba queen. He left the Kuba region to find enlightenment in the Pende and Kongo kingdoms to the west. After learning all he could from these states, he returned to Kuba to form the empire's political, social and economic foundations.

A new government

The Kuba government was reorganized toward a merit-based title system, but power still remained firmly in the hands of the aristocracy. The Kuba government was controlled by a king called the nyim who belonged to the Bushoong clan. The king was responsible to a court council of all the Kuba subgroups, who were represented equally before the king by their elites. The kingdom had an unwritten constitution, elected political offices, separation of political powers, a judicial system with courts and juries, a police force, a military, taxation, a significant public goods provision and socially supporting movements.

Growth
As the kingdom matured, it benefited from advanced techniques adopted from neighboring peoples as well as New World crops introduced from the Americas, such as maize, tobacco, cassava and beans. Kuba became very wealthy, which resulted in great artistic works commissioned by the Kuba nobility. The Kuba kings retained the most fanciful works for court ceremony and were also buried with these artifacts.

Apex 
The Kuba Kingdom reached its apex during the mid 19th century. Europeans first reached the area in 1884. Because of the kingdom's relative isolation, it was not as affected by the slave trade as were the Kongo and Ndongo kingdoms on the coast.

The current reigning monarch, Kot-a-Mbweeky III, has been on the throne since 1968.

Kuba culture

Kuba art

The Kuba are known for their raffia embroidered textiles, fiber and beaded hats, carved palm wine cups and cosmetic boxes, but they are most famous for their monumental helmet masks, featuring exquisite geometric patterns, stunning fabrics, seeds, beads and shells. 

The boxes, known as Kuba Boxes and called ngedi mu ntey by the Kuba, are generally used to hold tukula powder and paste. The boxes are usually in the shape of a square with a faceted lid, a semicircle (sometimes referred to as "half moon"), a rectangle or the shape of a mask. Sometimes they were used for holding razors for cutting raffia, hairpins or ritual objects.

Tukula (called twool by the Kuba) is a red powder made of ground cam wood. The color red is essential to the Kuba concept of beauty and was therefore used to ornament the face, hair and chest during dances and important ceremonies, as well as to anoint bodies for burial. Tukula was also mixed with other pigments to dye raffia cloth.

After 1700, King Misha mi-Shyaang a-Mbul introduced wooden sculptures called ndop figures that were carved to resemble the king and represent his individual reign. These figures always included the king's ibol or personal symbol, akin to a personal standard.

The carved palm-wine drinking cups and ornately carved boxes are identified with competition between titled court members among the Kuba. With half of all Bushoong men holding titles in the 1880s, competition for influence was sometimes fierce, and it found expression in the elaboration of these essentially commonplace household objects into works of extraordinary beauty.

Kuba religion and mythos

The Kuba believed in Bumba the Sky Father who spewed out the sun, moon, stars, and planets. He also created life with the Earth Mother. However these were somewhat distant deities, and the Kuba placed more immediate concern in a supernatural being named Woot, who named the animals and other things. Woot was the first human and bringer of civilization. The Kuba are sometimes known as the "Children of Woot."

See also
Lunda Kingdom
Luba Kingdom
William Henry Sheppard

References

Further reading

External links
An exhibit of Kuba art held at Clemson University in 2002
map of tribes in the area
Photos of Kuba Raffia Cloths
Kingdoms of the Savanna: The Kuba Kingdom
The Bwoom Mask of the Kuba People
Art & Life in Africa

Former countries in Africa
Former monarchies of Africa
Political history of the Democratic Republic of the Congo
 
1625 establishments in Africa
States and territories established in 1625
States and territories disestablished in 1900
Kasaï Province